Bari Centrale is the main railway station of the Italian city of Bari, capital of Apulia. It is one of the most important railway stations in Italy, with an annual ridership of 14 million.

History
The station was first built in 1864 and between 1865 and 1906 5 more platforms were added. In the first half of the 20th century it was further enlarged and renewed and in 1946, after World War II, the most recent renovation project was started.

Structure and transport

Bari Centrale lies in the middle of the city, at Aldo Moro square (Piazza Aldo Moro). It is a large junction station with 16 platforms for passenger service (13 for FS trains, 3 for FSE).

The station is situated on the lines Ancona–Pescara–Bari–Lecce (FS), Bari–Taranto (FS), Bari–Martina Franca–Taranto (FSE).

The station is divided into 3 areas. The main station is used by Trenitalia and FSE and features 16 platforms. On the west side of Piazza Aldo Moro are the entrances to the Ferrotramviaria and Ferrovie Appulo Lucane stations, with 3 and 2 platforms respectively.

The Centrale is an important transportation hub for the Apulia regional services. For long-distance transport it is served by Le Frecce (Frecciargento and Frecciabianca), InterCity and Express trains to Rome, Milan, Bologna, Turin and Venice.

Until 1994 it was served by the express "Parthenon" Athens–Paris.

Train services
The station is served by the following services:

High speed services (Frecciarossa) Milan–Bologna–Ancona–Pescara–Foggia–Bari
High speed services (Frecciargento) Rome–Foggia–Bari–Brindisi–Lecce
High speed services (Frecciabianca) Milan–Parma–Bologna–Ancona–Pescara–Foggia–Bari–Brindisi–Lecce
High speed services (Frecciabianca) Milan–Parma–Bologna–Ancona–Pescara–Foggia–Bari–Taranto
High speed services (Frecciabianca) Turin–Parma–Bologna–Ancona–Pescara–Foggia–Bari–Brindisi–Lecce
High speed services (Frecciabianca) Venice–Padua–Bologna–Ancona–Pescara–Foggia–Bari–Brindisi–Lecce
Intercity services Rome–Foggia–Bari (- Taranto)
Intercity services Bologna–Rimini–Ancona–Pescara–Foggia–Bari–Brindisi–Lecce
Intercity services Bologna–Rimini–Ancona–Pescara–Foggia–Bari–Taranto
Night train (Intercity Notte) Rome–Foggia–Bari–Brindisi–Lecce
Night train (Intercity Notte) Milan–Parma–Bolgona–Ancona–Pescara–Foggia–Bari–Brindisi–Lecce
Night train (Intercity Notte) Milan–Ancona–Pescara–Foggia–Bari–Taranto–Brindisi–Lecce
Night train (Intercity Notte) Turin–Alessandria–Bolgona–Ancona–Pescara–Foggia–Bari–Brindisi–Lecce
Regional services (Treno regionale) Bari–Brindisi–Lecce
Regional services (Treno regionale) Foggia–Barletta–Bari
Local services (Treno regionale) Bari–Gioia del Colle–Taranto
Local services (Treno regionale) Bari–Conversano–Putignano–Martina Franca
Local services (Treno regionale) Bari–Casamassima–Putignano
Local services (Treno regionale) Bari–Altamura–Gravina–Potenza
Local services (Treno regionale) Bari–Altamura–Matera
Bari Metropolitan services (FR1) Bitonto–Palese–Bari
Bari Metropolitan services (FR2) Barletta–Andria–Bitonto–Aeroporto–Bari
Bari Metropolitan services (FM1) Ospedale–Bari
Bari Metropolitan services (FM2) Bitonto–Aeroporto–Bari

Bus services

100 Bari–Valenzano–Adelfia–Putignano–Alberobello–Martina Franca
110 Bari–Casamassima–Gioia del Colle–Taranto
120 Bari–Triggiano–Capurso–Cellamare–Casamassima–Sammichele
130 Bari–Conversano–Putignano–Noci–Taranto
150 Bari–Monopoli–Fasano–Brindisi

Gallery

See also
 Bari metropolitan railway service
 List of Bari metropolitan railway stations
 Railway stations in Italy

References

External links

Centrale railway station
Railway stations in Apulia
Railway stations opened in 1864
Buildings and structures in the Province of Bari
1864 establishments in Italy
Railway stations in Italy opened in the 19th century